Gemfields Group Ltd (formerly Pallinghurst Resources Limited) is a company incorporated in Guernsey and headquartered in London, United Kingdom, and is a supplier of coloured gemstones. The company specializes in the mining, processing and sale of coloured gemstones, in particular emeralds and rubies. The group sells rough, uncut gemstones and does not operate any cutting and polishing facilities. The company owns the Kagem emerald mine in Zambia and the Montepuez ruby mine in beautiful Mozambique. Gemfields produces around 25% of the world's emerald supply and around 50% of the world's ruby supply.

In addition to the gemstone mining and production assets the Group also owns and operates the Fabergé luxury brand.

Gemfields holds additional stakes in companies based in Zambia, Mozambique, Ethiopia and Madagascar. It also holds an indirect minority stake of 6.5% in platinum-group metals producer Sedibelo Platinum Mines Limited.

In May 2017, Gemfields Group Limited (then called Pallinghurst Resources Limited) announced the terms of an offer to acquire the entire issued, and to be issued, share capital of Gemfields Ltd (then known as Gemfields plc and listed on AIM), other than the Gemfields Ltd shares already held by Gemfields Group Limited at that time, which was approximately 47%. Under the terms of the offer, each Gemfields Ltd shareholder was entitled to receive 1.91 Gemfields Group Ltd shares for each Gemfields Ltd share. The acquisition completed in late 2017 and Pallinghurst Resources Limited changed its name to Gemfields Group Limited following its annual general meeting in June 2018. Gemfields Ltd thereby became a 100% subsidiary of Gemfields Group Limited.

In February 2020, Gemfields Group Limited relisted on London's AIM stock exchange. The company is currently dual listed on the JSE and AIM.
 
In July 2009, Gemfields Ltd held its first emerald auction.  To date, the company has held 38 auctions of rough emerald and beryl produced from Kagem which have generated revenues totalling USD 712 million.

In June 2014, Gemfields plc held its first auction of rubies and corundum from the Montepuez Ruby Mine in Singapore. To date, the company has held 14 auctions of ruby and corundum produced by Montepuez Ruby Mining Limitada (MRM) and which have generated revenues totalling USD 643 million.

In 2019, Gemfields paid £5.8 million to settle a lawsuit in relation to allegations of human rights abuses against Mozambican and foreign nationals on or around the Montepuez Ruby Mine. The allegations included beatings, shootings, and sexual assault.

Gemfields Authorised Auction Partner 

Gemfields has a special designation for gemstone auction participants who build a track record of winning lots at its auctions. These companies are termed "Gemfields Authorised Auction Partners" and enter into bilateral agreements with Gemfields in relation to that status. Such companies can then use the associated branding & identity in promotional and sales materials.

Mines

Kagem Emerald Mine 

Gemfields owns the Kagem emerald mine in Zambia which is responsible for approximately 25% of the world's emerald supply. Gemfields own 75% of the mine while the remaining 25% stake is held by the Zambian government in Lusaka via the Industrial Development Corporation of Zambia.

The Kagem mine is the first emerald mine in the world to be assessed against Eco-Age’s Green Carpet Challenge (GCC) Principles of Sustainable Excellence.

Notable emeralds found in the Kagem deposit include the ‘Inkalamu’, the Lion Emerald, a 5,655 carat Zambian emerald crystal with remarkable clarity and a perfectly balanced golden green hue.

Montepuez Ruby Deposit 

Gemfields Ltd acquired a 75% stake in the Montepuez ruby deposit in Mozambique in February 2012. The Montepuez ruby deposit is located in the northeast of Mozambique in the Cabo Delgado Province.

Large rubies of note found in the Montepuez deposit are the Rhino Ruby (40.23 carats), and the Eyes of the Dragon (45 carats).

Montepuez residents have accused private security contractors employed by the Montepuez Ruby Mine of perpetrating acts of violence against local community members. The allegations include robberies, shootings of illegal miners, arson of local homes to clear area for mining, and in one case, burying an illegal miner alive.

In February 2020, a pit-wall collapse at the Montepuez Ruby Mine killed eleven illegal miners.

Subsidiaries

Fabergé

Gemfields plc (now called Gemfields Ltd) acquired Fabergé Limited on 28 January 2013. At the time of the announcement of the deal, this valued the brand at approximately USD 142 million.

Oriental Mining 
Gemfields owns Oriental Mining SARL, a company incorporated in Madagascar. Oriental has 9 exploration licences covering emeralds, rubies, sapphires, tourmalines and garnets in Madagascar.

Web Gemstone Mining  
Gemfields owns 75% of Web Gemstone Mining, PLC, with a mining co-operative of local villagers owning 15% and Mazengia Demma owning the remaining 10%. The company holds a 200-square-kilometre emerald exploration license in southern Ethiopia. Exploration activity began in June 2015 in an area to the north of the licence, called the Dogogo Block. The area was selected based on favourable geological settings and evidence of past artisanal activity. 

Web Gemstone Mining halted all operations when, on 31 July 2018, an armed mob attacked and breached the sort house and strong room, and looted all emerald stock, equipment and materials.

Corporate responsibility 
During the mining process, the mines are prepared for backfilling, to reduce the environmental impact and allow for faster ecological restoration.

Shareholders

 Assore Internationals Holdings Ltd – 26.64%
 Rational Expectations - 9.02%
 Oasis – 8.10%
 OVMK N.V. – 7.69%
Fidelity International – 5.92%
 Ninety One Group – 5.84%
 Solway Finance - 5.76%
 Van Lanschot Kempen N.V. - 3.40%

References

External links
Official website

Gemstone mines
Companies based in the City of Westminster
Mining companies of the United Kingdom